Ad Astra (Latin for "To the Stars") is a 2019 American psychological science fiction adventure drama film co-produced, co-written, and directed by James Gray. Starring Brad Pitt (who also co-produced), Tommy Lee Jones, Ruth Negga, Liv Tyler, and Donald Sutherland, it follows an astronaut who ventures into space in search of his lost father, whose obsessive quest to discover intelligent alien life at all costs threatens the Solar System and all life on Earth. The project was announced in early 2016, with Gray saying he wanted to feature "the most realistic depiction of space travel that's been put in a movie". Pitt signed on to star in April 2017 and the rest of the cast joined later that year. Filming began around Los Angeles that August, lasting through October.

Ad Astra premiered at the Venice Film Festival on August29, 2019, and was theatrically released in the United States on September20, 2019, by Walt Disney Studios Motion Pictures via 20th Century Fox. It received positive reviews from critics, with praise for Pitt's performance. At the 92nd Academy Awards, it was nominated for Best Sound Mixing. The film grossed $135million worldwide against an  budget.

Plot
In the late 21st century, the Solar System is being struck by mysterious power surges, threatening all human life. Major Roy McBride, son of presumed-dead astronaut H. Clifford McBride is informed by U.S. Space Command (SpaceCom) that the surges have been traced to the "Lima Project", created 29 years earlier  under Clifford's leadership to search the galaxy for intelligent life. Nothing has been heard from the Lima crew since reaching Neptune 16 years ago. Told his father may be alive, Roy agrees to travel to Mars from where he can attempt to establish communication with him. Roy is joined by Colonel Pruitt, his father's old associate. Roy, acclaimed for his ability to remain calm under extreme pressure, shows little emotional reaction to his father possibly being alive.

Arriving on the Moon, Roy and Pruitt are then escorted by U.S. military personnel to the SpaceCom base, located in a disputed war zone on the Moon's far side. En route in lunar rovers, scavenger pirates ambush them and kill the escorts. Roy and Pruitt make it to the base, but Pruitt suffers cardiac problems and remains behind. He gives Roy a classified message stating that if Roy fails to contact his father, then the Lima Project station will have to be destroyed. As Roy travels to Mars aboard Cepheus, a distress signal is received from a Norwegian biomedical research space station. Captain Tanner insists they must investigate, overriding Roy's protests that the mission takes precedence and other ships can respond. The station appears to be abandoned. Tanner and Roy split up to investigate; Roy discovers an escaped baboon attacking Tanner. Roy kills it and then a second baboon. Tanner dies from his injuries, but Roy shows little emotion. In a psychological evaluation, he admits to experiencing rage and recalls his father expressing his own rage.

Another surge hits as the Cepheus is attempting to land on Mars. Roy assumes command and calmly lands the ship after the acting captain/pilot is overcome with fear. In the underground SpaceCom base, Roy meets facility director Helen Lantos. He is told to record voice messages to send to the Lima Project in hopes that Clifford will respond. After receiving no response from their first message, the crew sends another, during which Roy goes off-script with an emotional appeal to his father. Clifford responds, though Roy is prevented from hearing the message. SpaceCom plans a mission to the Lima Project station but refuses to allow Roy to participate, believing his personal connection poses a risk. Roy's demand to hear the response is ignored and he is summarily removed to a "comfort room."

While sequestered, Roy is visited by Lantos, who reveals that both her parents were Lima Project team members. She shows Roy classified footage revealing that Clifford's team mutinied and attempted to return to Earth, causing him to shut off their life-support systems; her parents were among those killed. She tells Roy that the Cepheus will go to the Lima Project station to destroy it with a nuclear weapon. The two decide that Roy should confront Clifford, and Lantos helps Roy gain access to the rocket launch site.

Roy climbs aboard as the rocket takes off and is immediately discovered by the crew, who are instructed to neutralize him at any cost. The crew is unintentionally killed in the confrontation. During the 79-day journey to Neptune, a solitary Roy reflects on his relationship with his father and with his estranged wife, Eve. The mission's isolation and stress take a mental toll. While approaching the Lima Project station in a shuttle attached to the Cepheus, the shuttle is damaged in a collision with objects in Neptune's rings during another surge and is unable to dock with the station. Roy enters the station via a spacewalk while the shuttle drifts away. Finding the crew's dead bodies inside, he plants the nuclear weapon before encountering Clifford, the station's sole survivor. Clifford explains that the surges are coming from the ship's malfunctioning antimatter power source, which was damaged in the mutiny. Clifford reveals to Roy that there is no extraterrestrial life out there, and human beings are alone in this universe. Clifford admits to Roy that he never really cared about his family and does not consider Earth his home.

Roy copies data gathered by the Lima Project team and persuades Clifford to accompany him back to Earth. He arms the bomb and they climb out on the station's outer hull to return to the Cepheus. Clifford suddenly launches them into space using his spacesuit's thrusters. Clifford pleads for Roy to untether him; Roy reluctantly does so and watches his father drift away into space. Roy propels himself back to the Cepheus using his own spacesuit. Without enough fuel to return home, Roy relies on the shock wave from the nuclear explosion in the station to propel the Cepheus. The data retrieved from the Lima Project base suggests that humans are the only intelligent life in the galaxy. Roy is inspired to reconnect with those closest to him and he returns to Earth with a newfound optimism. After expressing his opinions in a psychological evaluation, he re-joins his wife.

Cast

Production
Director James Gray first confirmed his plans to write and direct Ad Astra on May12, 2016, during the 2016 Cannes Film Festival. In April 2017, while promoting The Lost City of Z, Gray compared the story of Ad Astra to Joseph Conrad's Heart of Darkness. Gray also mentioned that he intended for the film to feature "the most realistic depiction of space travel that's been put in a movie and to basically say, 'Space is awfully hostile to us. Gray also confirmed that filming for Ad Astra would commence on July17, 2017.

On April 10, 2017, Gray confirmed that Brad Pitt would star in Ad Astra. In June, Tommy Lee Jones joined the cast to portray Pitt's lost father. In August, Ruth Negga, John Finn, and Donald Sutherland joined the cast.

Principal photography on the film began in mid-August 2017 in Santa Clarita, California, lasting 60 days. Following poor initial test screenings, reshoots were conducted (although Pitt was unavailable), increasing the production budget from $80million to over $100million. Charlie Kaufman provided an uncredited rewrite of the voice-over dialogue in the film. Gray did not have control over the film's final cut, which he told The Hollywood Reporter was "as painful a thing as I have experienced outside the death of a loved one."

The visual effects were by Moving Picture Company, Method Studios, Mr. X, Weta Digital, Brainstorm Digital, and Capital T, and supervised by Allen Maris, Christopher Downs, Guillaume Rocheron, Ryan Tudhope, Aidan Fraser, Olaf Wendt, Anders Langlands, Eran Dinur, Jamie Hallett, and Territory Studio. Max Richter composed the film's score and recorded it at AIR Studios in London. Additionally, Lorne Balfe was asked to write additional music for the score. The orchestra and choir was then recorded at Synchron Stage Vienna. James Gray consulted with experimental film scholars Gregory Zinman and Leo Goldsmith for inspiration on the visuals.

Release

Ad Astra had its world premiere at the Venice Film Festival on August29, 2019. It was released on September20, 2019, by Walt Disney Studios Motion Pictures through its division 20th Century Fox. It had previously been scheduled for January11, 2019, and then for May24 before being pushed back.

Ad Astra was released on digital and Movies Anywhere by 20th Century Fox Home Entertainment (through Walt Disney Studios Home Entertainment) on December3, 2019, with Blu-ray, 4K Ultra HD, and DVD releases following on December17.

Reception

Box office
Ad Astra grossed $50.2 million in the United States and Canada and $85.2million in other territories, for a worldwide total of $135.4million against an estimated production budget of $80million.

In the United States and Canada, the film was released alongside Downton Abbey and Rambo: Last Blood, and was projected to gross  from 3,450 theaters in its opening weekend. The film made $7.2million on its first day, including $1.5million from Thursday night previews. It went on to debut to $19million, finishing second behind Downton Abbey. The opening was compared to First Man (2018), another drama involving outer space which received high praise from critics but a lukewarm audience reception, resulting in a muted box office turnout despite its cast and budget. Deadline Hollywood deduced the film would lose $30million off a projected $150million final worldwide gross (a figure it would ultimately fall short of). The film made $10.1million in its second weekend and $4.4million in its third, finishing fifth and sixth, respectively.

Critical response
The website's critical consensus reads, "Ad Astra takes a visually thrilling journey through the vast reaches of space while charting an ambitious course for the heart of the bond between parent and child." On Metacritic, which uses a weighted average, the film has a score of 80 out of 100, based on 56 critics, indicating "generally favorable reviews". Audiences polled by CinemaScore gave the film an average grade of "B−" on an A+ to F scale, while those surveyed at PostTrak gave it an average 2.5 out of 5 stars, with 40% saying they would definitely recommend it.

Richard Roeper of the Chicago Sun-Times gave the film 3.5 out of 4 stars, writing, "In the hands of director and co-writer James Gray, Ad Astra is one of the most beautiful films of the year, even when it makes little sense and even when Brad Pitt's performance veers between one of his all-time best and one of his all-time not-best." David Ehrlich of IndieWire gave the film an "A" and said, "Ad Astra is one of the most ruminative, withdrawn, and curiously optimistic space epics this side of Solaris. It's also one of the best." Similarly, Xan Brooks of The Guardian gave the film five out of five stars, called it a "superb space-opera", and praised Pitt's performance, saying, "Pitt embodies McBride with a series of deft gestures and a minimum of fuss. His performance is so understated it hardly looks like acting at all."

Variety critic Owen Gleiberman praised Pitt's performance, explaining, "Gray proves beyond measure that he's got the chops to make a movie like this. He also has a vision, of sortsone that's expressed, nearly inadvertently, in the metaphor of that space antenna." Peter Travers of Rolling Stone rated the film four out of five stars and referred to it as "absolutely enthralling" and praised Gray for his direction and his unique approach to the science fiction genre, as well as the cinematography and Pitt's performance (whom he referred to as "marvel of nuanced feeling"). He also drew comparisons of the film's tone and themes to other notable films set in space, particularly 2001: A Space Odyssey (1968), Solaris (1972), Gravity (2013), and Interstellar (2014). Critic Kurt Loder praised the visual effects but criticized the lack of originality and the patchwork style of the script. Adam Graham writing for The Detroit News found problems with the film, giving it a "C" rating: "This is slow, obtuse filmmaking with little emotional connection."

Accolades

References

External links
 
 
 
 

2010s adventure drama films
2010s American films
2010s English-language films
2010s science fiction adventure films
2010s science fiction drama films
2019 action films
2019 adventure films
2019 drama films
2019 science fiction films
20th Century Fox films
American adventure drama films
American science fiction adventure films
American science fiction drama films
Films about astronauts
Films about extraterrestrial life
Films about father–son relationships
Films directed by James Gray
Films produced by Arnon Milchan
Films produced by Brad Pitt
Films scored by Max Richter
Films shot in Los Angeles
IMAX films
Mars in film
Moon in film
Neptune in film
Plan B Entertainment films
Regency Enterprises films
TSG Entertainment films